The Philippine Science High School System is a research-oriented and specialized public high school system in the Philippines that operates as an attached agency of the Philippine Department of Science and Technology.

The Philippine Science High School, PSHS, or Pisay may refer to any of the system's 16 campuses. It may also refer to a 2007 film in honor of the high school.

Luzon
Philippine Science High School Ilocos Region Campus
Philippine Science High School Cagayan Valley Campus
Philippine Science High School Cordillera Administrative Region Campus
Philippine Science High School Central Luzon Campus
Philippine Science High School Calabarzon Region Campus
Philippine Science High School Mimaropa Region Campus
Philippine Science High School Bicol Region Campus
Philippine Science High School Main Campus – Metro Manila

Visayas
Philippine Science High School Western Visayas Campus
Philippine Science High School Central Visayas Campus
Philippine Science High School Eastern Visayas Campus

Mindanao
Philippine Science High School Zamboanga Peninsula Region Campus
Philippine Science High School Central Mindanao Campus
Philippine Science High School Southern Mindanao Campus
Philippine Science High School Soccsksargen Region Campus
Philippine Science High School Caraga Region Campus

Philippine Science High School System